The Most Beautiful Ugly is the fourth solo studio album by American hip hop musician Thavius Beck. It was released through Plug Research on September 11, 2012.

Critical reception

At Metacritic, which assigns a weighted average score out of 100 to reviews from mainstream critics, the album received an average score of 69, based on 4 reviews, indicating "generally favorable reviews".

Jason Lymangrover of AllMusic gave the album 3.5 stars out of 5, saying: "Two skills he has mastered in the past, mood and texture, make this record especially listenable, although sometimes the productions are so professionally crafted that they sound sterile." He called it "a great showcase for his digital, beat-oriented productions and kaleidoscopic tastes." Bram E. Gieben of The Skinny gave the album 4 stars out of 5, stating that the album "has about fifty times as many ideas crammed into it as most hip-hop records, even without his mythic, hallucinatory, Hermetic philosophy-influenced rhymes."

Track listing

Personnel
Credits adapted from liner notes.

 Thavius Beck – production, recording, mixing
 Emilie Quinquis – vocals (13)
 Mear One – artwork
 Laz Pit – layout

References

External links
 

2012 albums
Thavius Beck albums
Plug Research albums